Kaykan may refer to:

Svetlana Kaykan, Russian speed skater
Gaygan, a village in Iran